"Millennium" is a song by English singer Robbie Williams from his second studio album, I've Been Expecting You (1998). On 7 September 1998, it was released as the first track from the album and became Williams' first single to top the UK Singles Chart. The song also received extensive airplay in the United States and Canada, where it was the lead single from Williams' 1999 compilation album, The Ego Has Landed.

The song borrows heavily from the musical arrangement of John Barry's "You Only Live Twice", the title track of the 1967 James Bond film, said to be one of Williams' favourite James Bond movies. However, it is a re-recording in a slightly different key instead of a direct sample for reasons of cost.

Recording and composing
The song that would become "Millennium" started being written in 1997. Robbie Williams and producer Guy Chambers got along at Blah Street Studios in Hampshire, where Williams expressed the idea to do something based on James Bond. From that start, Chambers decided that he would sample "You Only Live Twice" by Nancy Sinatra, which featuring what he considered an "iconic intro" that "grabs you straight away", and that Williams wanted the addition of a hip-hop beat, which was achieved by speeding up the sample. Chambers then created a simple bassline for the verses. When Williams' lyrics were mostly done, Chambers felt it lacked "an obvious title for the track", and suggested "Millennium" for being "both strong and topical", because as Chambers said in a retrospective review, "There was a lot of talk about the millennium back then, it’s a bit like the 'Brexit' word now".  Then Chambers asked for a "football chant", which only had a melody before Williams came up with "come and have a go if you think you're hard enough'." The whole writing process took about four hours, and Chambers described "Millennium" as "the simplest song Robbie and I have ever written - only two chords. And it's written in D flat major, which is very unusual in pop music."

Once co-producer Steve Power heard the demo, which already had a sample of they found potential for a single given it showed a different sound from Williams' debut album Life thru a Lens. As Power explained: "It had the more programming-based feel that we wanted to introduce on the second album in order to get away from the guitar-based feel of the first album, and it already had the chorus hook, the Bond theme sample, on the demo version, which I remember mixing before last Christmas."

Trident Studios in London was used for the majority of the recordings, including drums, bass and samples for the backing track, and the backing vocals, which included three female session singers and male vocals by Williams' guitarist Gary Nuttall. Williams' vocals were done at Jacobs Studios in Surrey.

Williams suggested using a sample only accompanied by a hip-hop beat. Guy Chambers found a beat by speeding the sample up. The record label, Chrysalis Records, discovered that a new recording would cost only one tenth of the licensing fee that would be required to sample "You Only Live Twice", so they asked for a new string section that still acted as a recognisable pastiche of the song. Nick Ingman arranged the orchestra, which according to Power "was in the wrong key for 'Millennium', although we did want it to sound like the original sample in the choruses and we did refer to John Barry's original score for that", and conducted a 26-piece string section, plus harp and four French horns, at Angel Recording Studios in Islington to the programmed backing track, with a guide vocal over the top.

Power said the song used most of the 48 tracks offered by the multitrack tape: "We had about six tracks of backing vocals, and nine tracks for the strings. Then there were the programmed tracks; and when you get into programming, you'll layer about four kick drums to tape! For speed, and to keep the creative flow going, we put them all down to separate tracks rather than spend time deciding which one we wanted loudest when recording. So we had a lot of independent outs from the programmed backing track onto separate multitrack channels, like the programmed percussion and sampled noises. Then there were the unused scratching tracks, and the live percussion - all in all, I think we filled maybe 36 or 38 tracks in total."

Music video
The tongue-in-cheek video for "Millennium", directed by Vaughan Arnell, features Williams parodying James Bond, complete with dinner jacket and references to Bond films like Thunderball and From Russia with Love. The video was filmed at Pinewood Studios, home to most Bond productions. During the video, Williams travels in an aeroplane and fails to fly a futuristic jet pack. He is also seen flirting with girls in an over-the-top manner and caricaturing the facial expressions of Sean Connery. He is seen in a boat, clearly a studio model, against an obviously projected background characteristic of 1960s Bond films. During the end of the video, Williams drives away in an economy car, a Bond Bug, instead of 007's Aston Martin DB5, which later drives past him while he is having car trouble. Lorraine Pascale appears in the video as a 'Bond Girl'.

At the 1999 Brit Awards, "Millennium" won the award for British Video of the Year.

Chart performance
The song became Williams' first number-one single in the United Kingdom, shipping over 400,000 copies and being certified platinum by the British Phonographic Industry (BPI). The song also became an international success; it managed to break into the Top 40 around the world. It also became Williams' first song to chart inside the US Billboard Hot 100 when it was released in 1999. While neither "Millennium" nor "Angels" (the song chosen as his second single in the United States) charted in the top 40 of the Billboard Hot 100, it did chart at number 20 on the Mainstream Top 40 chart.

Track listings

UK CD1
 "Millennium" – 4:06
 "Love Cheat" (demo version) – 3:46
 "Rome Munich Rome" (demo version) – 3:05

UK CD2 and cassette single
 "Millennium" – 4:06
 "Lazy Days" (original version) – 4:29
 "Angels" (live) – 5:38

European CD single
 "Millennium" – 4:06
 "Angels" (live) – 5:38

Australian and Japanese CD single
 "Millennium" – 4:06
 "Angels" (live) – 5:38
 "Rome Munich Rome" (demo version) – 3:05
 "Love Cheat" (demo version) – 3:46

Credits and personnel
Credits are lifted from the I've Been Expecting You booklet.

Studio
 Mastered at Metropolis Mastering (London, England)

Personnel

 Robbie Williams – writing, vocals
 Guy Chambers – writing, acoustic guitar, electric guitar, bass synth, keyboards, production, arrangement
 Leslie Bricusse – writing
 John Barry – writing
 Gary Nuttall – background vocals
 Claudia Fontaine – background vocals
 Beverley Skeete – background vocals
 Nicole Patterson – background vocals

 Chris Sharrock – drums
 Andy Duncan – percussion
 London Session Orchestra – orchestra
 Gavyn Wright – orchestra leader
 Nick Ingman – orchestral arrangement
 Steve Power – production, recording, mixing, programming
 Steve McNichol – programming
 Steve Price – orchestral engineering
 Tony Cousins – mastering

Charts

Weekly charts

Year-end charts

Certifications

|}

Release history

References

1998 songs
1998 singles
Robbie Williams songs
Capitol Records singles
Chrysalis Records singles
Music videos directed by Vaughan Arnell
Number-one singles in Scotland
Song recordings produced by Guy Chambers
Song recordings produced by Steve Power
Songs with music by John Barry (composer)
Songs written by Guy Chambers
Songs written by Leslie Bricusse
Songs written by Robbie Williams
UK Singles Chart number-one singles